Toghrol Al Jerd District is a district (bakhsh) in Kuhbanan County, Kerman Province, Iran. At the 2006 census, its population was 9,930, in 2,471 families.  The district has one city: Kian Shahr. The district has two rural districts (dehestan): Shaab Jereh Rural District and Toghrol Al Jerd Rural District.

References 

Kuhbanan County
Districts of Kerman Province